Keith Jerrold Gary (born September 14, 1959) is a former American football defensive end. Gary was selected in the first round by the Pittsburgh Steelers out of the University of Oklahoma in the 1981 NFL Draft, but didn't sign and went to play two seasons with the Montreal Alouettes and Montreal Concordes of the CFL. He then played six seasons with the Steelers. 

He may perhaps be best known for committing one of the most vicious facemask penalties in NFL history. During a Week 6 game against the Cincinnati Bengals in 1983, he grabbed quarterback Ken Anderson, ripping his facemask off and knocking Anderson out of the game with a severe neck sprain. Later in the same game he was penalized for a late hit on Bengals back up quarterback Turk Schonert. Gary was fined by the NFL for the vicious facemask penalty that left Anderson without feeling below the neck.

References

People from Bethesda, Maryland
Players of American football from Maryland
American football defensive ends
Canadian football defensive linemen
American players of Canadian football
Pittsburgh Steelers players
Montreal Alouettes players
Montreal Concordes players
Oklahoma Sooners football players
1959 births
Living people
Chantilly High School alumni